Hamdi Hassan (12 August 1956 – 25 November 2021) was an Egyptian politician. A member of the Muslim Brotherhood in Egypt, he served in the House of Representatives from 2005 to 2010.

References

1956 births
2021 deaths
21st-century Egyptian politicians
Members of the House of Representatives (Egypt)
Egyptian Muslim Brotherhood members
Politicians from Alexandria
Egyptian people who died in prison custody